The Greatest Croatian was an open-access poll conducted over five weeks in 2003 by the Croatian weekly Nacional.

The public was invited to vote via the magazine's website, text messages and postcards to determine the "Greatest Croatian" in history. Almost 8,000 votes were received during the course of the poll (6,507 via Internet, 520 text messages and 752 postcards), and the final results were published in the magazine's 6 January 2004 issue.

Final list

Due to the nature of the poll used to select and rank, the results do not pretend to be an objective assessment. The poll also had no rules on ethnicity or nationality of candidates, with readers free to send in votes for whomever they felt contributed to the history and society of modern-day Croatia.

In addition, Nacional published the list of people ordered by votes received, although two of these were listed twice in duplicate entries, which was likely due to tabulation error:
Painter Vlaho Bukovac was listed at no. 64 (with 13 votes) and no. 80 (with 7 votes). If these had been added up, he would have moved up to share no. 52 spot, with filmmaker Dušan Vukotić and pop singer Severina.  
Nobel Prize-winning chemist Vladimir Prelog was listed at no. 57 (with 17 votes) and no. 96 (with 2 votes). If these had been added up, he would have moved up to share no. 54 spot, with politician Ivica Račan and folk rock singer Marko Perković Thompson.  

Without the two duplicates, the list would have had 96 entries, but since two of these involve pairs of notable people (17th-century noblemen Petar Zrinski and Fran Krsto Frankopan at no. 37, and 19th-century explorer brothers Mirko and Stjepan Seljan at no. 88) the list ends up having 98 individuals. 

They are as follows:

 Josip Broz Tito (1892–1980), revolutionary, statesman and president of Yugoslavia 1953–1980
 Ruđer Bošković (1711–1787), physicist, astronomer, mathematician and philosopher
 Miroslav Krleža (1893–1981), writer, playwright and poet
 Franjo Tuđman (1922–1999), statesman, President of Croatia 1990–99
 Dražen Petrović (1964–1993), basketball player, Olympic silver medalist
 Stjepan Mesić (b. 1934), President of Croatia 2000–10
 Tin Ujević (1891–1955), poet
 Stevo Karapandža (b. 1947), celebrity chef
 Tomislav of Croatia (?–928), 10th-century ruler of Croatia
 Rahim Ademi (b. 1954), Croatian Army general
 Stipe Šuvar (1936–2004), sociologist and politician
 Vlado Gotovac (1930–2000), poet and politician
 Ivan Meštrović (1883–1962), sculptor and architect
 Josip Juraj Strossmayer (1815–1905), Roman Catholic bishop, benefactor and politician
 Janica Kostelić (b. 1982), alpine ski racer, Olympic gold medalist
 Stjepan Radić (1871–1928), early 20th century politician
 Josip Jelačić (1801–1859), 19th-century Ban (viceroy) of Croatia
 Ante Starčević (1823–1896), 19th-century politician
 Alojzije Stepinac (1898–1960), Roman Catholic cardinal, Archbishop of Zagreb 1937–1960
 Branimir Štulić (b. 1953), singer, songwriter and poet
 Rade Šerbedžija (b. 1946), stage and film actor
 Matija Gubec (c. 1556–1573), 16th-century leader of a peasant revolt
 Mirko Ilić (b. 1956), graphic designer and comics artist
 Miroslav Radman (b. 1944), biologist
 Ivan Supek (1915–2007), physicist, philosopher, and writer
 Franjo Kuharić (1919–2002), Roman Catholic cardinal, Archbishop of Zagreb 1970–1997
 Branko Bauer (1921–2002), film director
 Ante Gotovina (b. 1955), Croatian army lieutenant-general
 Miljenko Smoje (1923–1995), writer and journalist
 Goran Ivanišević (b. 1971), tennis player, winner of Wimbledon
 Marija Jurić Zagorka (1873–1957), journalist and novelist
 Ivana Brlić-Mažuranić (1874–1938), children's writer
 Ljudevit Gaj (1809–1872), 19th-century linguist, politician and writer
 Marko Marulić (1450–1524), 15th-century poet
 Petar Zrinski (1621–1671) & Fran Krsto Frankopan (1643–1671), 17th-century noblemen, leaders of the Magnate conspiracy
 Mile Dedaković (b. 1951), soldier, one of the Croatian commanders in the 1991 Battle of Vukovar
 Lavoslav Ružička (1887–1976), scientist, Nobel Prize in Chemistry laureate
 Juraj Dalmatinac (1410–1473), medieval sculptor and architect
 Krešimir Ćosić (1948–1995), basketball player, Olympic medalist and Basketball Hall of Fame inductee
 Slavoljub Penkala (1871–1922), engineer and inventor, created the mechanical pencil
 Vladimir Nazor (1876–1949), author and politician
 Ivan Gundulić (1589–1638), baroque Ragusan poet
 Arsen Dedić (1938–2015), singer-songwriter, composer and poet
 Marin Držić (1508–1567), renaissance Ragusan playwright
 Tarik Filipović (b. 1972), actor and television personality
 Goran Bregović (b. 1950), musician and composer
 Mate Ujević (1901–1967), poet and lexicographer
 Savka Dabčević-Kučar (1923–2009), politician, one of the leaders of the Croatian Spring movement
 Miroslav Blažević (b. 1935), association football coach, led Croatia to third place in the 1998 FIFA World Cup
 Dušan Vukotić (1927–1998), cartoonist, winner of the Academy Award for Best Animated Short Film
 Severina Vučković (b. 1972), pop singer and actress
 Ivica Račan (1944–2007), politician and prime minister of Croatia 2000–2003
 Marko Perković Thompson (b. 1966), pop singer
 Ivan Goran Kovačić (1913–1943), poet and writer, killed in World War II
 Vladimir Prelog (1906–1998), scientist, Nobel Prize in Chemistry laureate
 Branko Lustig (1932–2019), film producer, two-time Academy Awards winner
 Dražen Budiša (b. 1948), politician, one of the leaders of the Croatian Spring movement
 Mate Parlov (1948–2008), boxer, Olympic gold medalist
 Vatroslav Lisinski (1819–1854), 19th-century composer
 Faust Vrančić (1551–1617), polymath and inventor, best known for his 16th-century parachute design
 Boris Dvornik (1939–2008), actor
 Vlaho Bukovac (1855–1922), painter
 Andrija Štampar (1888–1958), promoter of social medicine
 Bernard Vukas (1927–1983), footballer, best known for his two spells at HNK Hajduk Split
 Zinka Kunc (1906–1989), opera soprano, performed at New York's Metropolitan Opera and Milan's La Scala opera houses
 Antun Mihanović (1796–1861), poet, best known for penning the lyrics to the Croatian anthem
 Fabijan Šovagović (1932–2001), actor
 Slavenka Drakulić (b. 1949), writer and journalist
 August Šenoa (1838–1881), 19th-century novelist
 Andrija Maurović (1901–1981), comic book artist, known as the "father of Croatian comics"
 Antun Augustinčić (1900–1979), sculptor
 Ante Topić Mimara (1898–1987), art collector, founder of the Mimara Museum
 Edo Murtić (1921–2005), painter
 Ivo Pogorelić (b. 1958), pianist
 Bruno Bušić (1939–1978), promoter of Croatia's independence, assassinated in exile in 1978
 Frano Supilo (1870–1917), politician and journalist, founder of Novi list daily
 Goran Višnjić (b. 1972), actor, best known for starring in the American TV series ER
 Vlaho Bukovac (duplicate entry, see #64)
 Andrija Hebrang (1899–1949), politician
 Dragutin Gorjanović-Kramberger (1856–1936), paleontologist, discovered the Neanderthal site near Krapina
 Juraj Križanić (1618–1683), 17th-century Catholic missionary
 Marin Getaldić (1568–1626), Ragusan scientist, best known for his work in optics
 Antun Gustav Matoš (1873–1914), poet and essayist
 Franjo Šeper (1905–1981), Roman Catholic cardinal, Archbishop of Zagreb 1960–1970
 Oliver Mlakar (b. 1935), television presenter
 Mirko Seljan (1871–1913) & Stjepan Seljan (1875–1936), explorers best known for their travels in South America and Africa
 Ivan Lupis (1813–1875), officer of the Austrian Navy, credited as the inventor of the torpedo
 Ante Trumbić (1864–1938), politician
 Franjo Trenk (1711–1749), Austrian officer, known as "father of the military band"
 Ivo Robić (1923–2000), singer and songwriter
 Ivan Generalić (1914–1992), naïve art painter
 Lovro pl. Matačić (1899–1985), conductor
 Slava Raškaj (1877–1906), 19th-century deaf woman painter
 Vladimir Prelog (duplicate entry, see #57)
 Branko Gavella (1885–1962), theatre director and essayist
 Krešo Golik (1922–1996), film director and screenwriter
 Bartol Kašić (1575–1650), linguist, wrote the first Croatian grammar and translated the Bible into Croatian
 Marko Turina (b. 1937), cardiac surgeon, first surgeon to operate a congenital heart defect on a newborn

See also
100 Greatest Britons
Greatest Britons spin-offs

References

External links

Croatia
Lists of Croatian people
2003 in Croatia